Sarmaster Chak is a village within the jurisdiction of the Bishnupur police station in the Bishnupur I CD block in the Alipore Sadar subdivision of the South 24 Parganas district in the Indian state of West Bengal.

Geography

Demographics
As per 2011 Census of India, Sarmaster Chak had a total population of 894.

Transport
Sarmaster Chak is on the National Highway 12.

Majerhat railway station is located nearby.

Healthcare
Chandi Doulatabad Block Primary Health Centre, with 10 beds, at Doulatabad (PO Nepalganj), is the major government medical facility in the Bishnupur I CD block.

References

Villages in South 24 Parganas district